Baptistin is a French given name and surname. Notable people with this name include:

 Baptistin Baille, professor of optics and acoustics
 Victor-Baptistin Senès, French naval officer and admiral

See also 
 Baptist (surname)
 Baptiste (name)
 Baptista (Portuguese surname) meaning "Baptist"